Hamilton West—Ancaster—Dundas is a federal electoral district in Ontario. It encompasses a portion of Ontario previously included in the electoral districts of Ancaster—Dundas—Flamborough—Westdale, Hamilton Centre and Hamilton Mountain.

Hamilton West—Ancaster—Dundas was created by the 2012 federal electoral boundaries redistribution and was legally defined in the 2013 representation order. It came into effect upon the call of the 42nd Canadian federal election, on October 19, 2015.

Demographics 
According to the 2021 Canada Census

Ethnic groups: 71.4% White, 6.4% South Asian, 4.4% Chinese, 3.8% Black, 3.5% Arab, 1.8% Latin American, 1.8% Indigenous, 1.6% Filipino, 1.6% West Asian

Languages: 71.1% English, 2.7% Arabic, 2.4% Mandarin, 2.3% Italian, 1.5% Spanish, 1.0% Portuguese, 1.0% Polish

Religions: 54.6% Christian (27.2% Catholic, 4.4% United Church, 4.1% Anglican, 2.5% Christian Orthodox, 2.1% Presbyterian, 1.6% Baptist, 1.0% Pentecostal, 11.7% Other), 7.3% Muslim, 1.9% Hindu, 1.5% Jewish, 1.0% Sikh, 32.4% None

Median income: $44,000 (2020)

Average income: $69,000 (2020)

Members of Parliament

This riding has elected the following Members of Parliament:

Election results

References

Ontario federal electoral districts
Politics of Hamilton, Ontario
2013 establishments in Ontario